BOE, BoE or Boe may refer to:

Abbreviations, acronyms or initialisms 
 Bank of England, the central bank of the United Kingdom
 Bank of English, a representative subset of the 4.5 billion words COBUILD corpus
 Barrel of oil equivalent, a unit of energy
 Basis of estimate in project management 
 Bastards of Evil, a comic book supervillain team
 Bill of Exchange
 Blades of Exile, a computer role-playing game
 Blue Ocean Event, a hypothetical future ice-free season in the Arctic
 Board of education
 Board of elections
 Board of Equalization
 BOE Technology, a Chinese electronic components manufacturer
 Boeing ICAO three-letter airline identifier
 Boletín Oficial del Estado, Official Gazette of the Spanish government
 Book of Eli, a 2010 film
 Buffered oxide etch, a mixture of ammonia and hydrofluoric acid used in microfabrication
 Bureau of Energy, an administrative agency of Taiwan (Republic of China)
 Bureau of Ocean Energy Management, Regulation and Enforcement, an agency of the United States Department of the Interior'
 Back of the envelope, ie a rough calculation

Locations 

 Boé, a town in south-western France
 Boe Constituency, Nauru
 Boe District, Nauru
 Boe, Guinea-Bissau, a settlement
 Boundji Airport, Congo (IATA code: BOE)

People 

 Boe (surname)

See also 
 Bøe
 Boô (alternate spelling), a Saxon cattle shed
 The Face of Boe, a recurring character in the TV series Doctor Who